Lanco Amarkantak Power Plant is a coal based thermal power project located at Pathadi village in Korba district in Indian state of Chhattisgarh. The power plant owned and operated by Lanco Infratech.

Capacity
Its planned capacity is 1920 MW (2x300 MW, 2x660 MW).

References

External links
 Amarkantak Thermal Power Project at SourceWatch

Coal-fired power stations in Chhattisgarh
Korba district
Energy infrastructure completed in 2009
2009 establishments in Chhattisgarh